Babahajji or Baba Hajji or Babahaji may refer to:
 Baba Hajji, Kerman